Square Dance Jubilee is a 1949 American Western musical film directed by Paul Landres starring Don "Red" Barry, Mary Beth Hughes and Wally Vernon.

Plot
While searching for entertainers to place on a TV show, two talent scouts become entangled in cattle rustling.

Cast
 Don "Red" Barry as Don Blake (as Don Barry)
 Mary Beth Hughes as Barbara Clayton
 Wally Vernon as Seldom Sam Jenks
 Spade Cooley as Spade Cooley
 Max Terhune as Sheriff
 John Eldredge as Jed Stratton
 Thurston Hall as G.K.
 Chester Clute as Yes-Man
 Tom Tyler as Henchman Buck
 Tom Kennedy as Bartender Tom
 Britt Wood as Grubby
 Clark Stevens as Henchman Jim Clark
 Marshall Reed as Charlie Jordan
 Lee Roberts as Line-Shack Henchman 
 Alex Montoya as Alvin
 Cliff Taylor as Short Comic
 Ralph Moody as Indian Chief 
 Hazel Nilsen as Secretary Betty (as Hazel Nilson)
 Snub Pollard as Show Spectator
 Tex Cooper as Show Spectator
 Dorothy Vernon as Townswoman
 Slim Gaut as Tall Comic (as Slim Gault)
 Hal King Television Opeator
 Cowboy Copas as Cowboy Copas
 Claude Casey as Singer
 The Broome Brothers as Broome Brothers
 Buddy McDonald as Townsman
 Smiley and Kitty as Singers
 Johnny Downs as Johnny Downs
 Herman the Hermit as Townsman
 Dana Gibson as Townswoman
 Ray Vaughn as Townsman
 Charles Cirillo as Townsman
 The Tumbleweed Tumblers as Tumblers
 Don Remey as Townsman 
 The Elder Lovelies as Elder Dancers (as The Elder Lovlies)
 Les Gotcher as Square Dance Caller

References

External links
 
 Square Dance Jubilee at BFI

1949 films
American Western (genre) musical films
Films directed by Paul Landres
1940s Western (genre) musical films
Lippert Pictures films
American black-and-white films
1940s English-language films
1940s American films